Brian Keaulana is a well known Hawaiian surfer, lifeguard, and waterman. He played himself in Baywatch: Hawaii and has provided invaluable support as a stunt coordinator in dozens of major motion pictures.  He has extensive experience for water stunts.

Relatives
Son of the legendary Hawaiian 'Buffalo' Keaulana. Born and raised on the beach at Makaha. His brother, Rusty Keaulana was 3 time Asp World Longboard Champion.

Filmography

Film
Point Break 2015 stunt coordinator: Hawaii
Jurassic World 2015 stunts
Dawn of the Planet of the Apes 2014 stunts
The Descendants 2011 stunt coordinator
Forgetting Sarah Marshall 2008 stunts as Brian Keaulana
Pipeline 2007 stunt coordinator
Memoirs of a Geisha 2005 stunts
The Big Bounce 2004 as Barry Salu
50 First Dates 2004 as Jet Skier
In God's Hands 1995 as Brian
Waterworld 1995 stunts
Baywatch the Movie: Forbidden Paradise 1995 as Brian Keaulana
The Endless Summer II 1994 as surfer

Television
Hawaii Five-0 (TV) 2010 as Brian Keaulana (2 episodes 2010-1)
Beyond the Break (TV) 2007 stunts/stunts performer (7 episodes 2006-7)
Fear Factor (TV) 2005
North Shore (TV) 2005 as stunt coordinator
Baywatch: Hawaii (TV) 1999-2001 as himself

References

External links

American surfers
Sportspeople from Hawaii
People from Honolulu County, Hawaii
Living people
Year of birth missing (living people)